Aaron LeRenze Craver (born December 18, 1968) is a former American football running back and kick returner in the NFL for the Miami Dolphins, Denver Broncos, San Diego Chargers, and the New Orleans Saints.  He played college football at Fresno State University. He is the only football player to catch a touchdown pass from John Elway and Dan Marino.  In 2006, he was inducted into the Fresno County Athletic Hall of Fame. Aaron Craver is currently the track and field and football coach at Woodbridge High School in Irvine, California.

References

1968 births
Living people
Players of American football from Los Angeles
American football fullbacks
Fresno State Bulldogs football players
Miami Dolphins players
Denver Broncos players
San Diego Chargers players
New Orleans Saints players
Ed Block Courage Award recipients